Born That Way is a 1936 British comedy film directed by Randall Faye and starring Elliott Mason, Kathleen Gibson and Terence De Marney. The film a quota quickie made at the Nettlefold Studios for distribution by RKO Pictures. A Scottish woman tries to take her brother-in-law's wild living children in hand.

Cast
 Elliott Mason as Aunt Emily 
 Kathleen Gibson as Pamela Gearing 
 Terence De Marney as Richard Gearing 
 Eliot Makeham as Prof. Gearing 
 Ian Colin as Hugh 
 Conway Palmer as Kenneth Danvers 
 John Laurie as McTavish

References

Bibliography
 Chibnall, Steve. Quota Quickies: The British of the British 'B' Film. British Film Institute, 2007.
 Low, Rachael. Filmmaking in 1930s Britain. George Allen & Unwin, 1985.
 Wood, Linda. British Films, 1927-1939. British Film Institute, 1986.

External links

1936 films
British comedy films
British black-and-white films
1936 comedy films
Films directed by Randall Faye
Films shot at Nettlefold Studios
1930s English-language films
1930s British films